Paul Ayers Robert Foster-Bell (born March 1977) is a former New Zealand diplomat, a politician and was a list member of the House of Representatives between May 2013 and 2017. He is a member of the National Party and a monarchist. He failed to win the party's nomination for the  electorate in March 2014, but remained in Parliament as a list MP for the following term.

Early life
Foster-Bell was born in Whangarei in 1977 and grew up on a beef farm in the Portland area. His parents are Bob and Alyse Foster-Bell. He attended Otaika Primary School, Raumanga Intermediate and Whangarei Boys' High School. He studied in Dunedin, gaining a degree in archaeology (2003) and a diploma in business (2008) from Otago University. He is of English, Scots, Irish, Portuguese and Māori descent.

Career
Foster-Bell was a diplomat and his last assignment was as Deputy Head of Mission at the New Zealand Embassy in Riyadh, Saudi Arabia, having previously served as First Secretary & Consul in Tehran in Iran, and Deputy High Commissioner to Pakistan. In Wellington he worked in the Ministry of Foreign Affairs and Trade's (MFAT) Middle East and Africa division, as Deputy Chief of Protocol, and as a Regional Manager in the Ministry's Security Directorate. He took leave from MFAT from June to November 2011 to contest a parliamentary election.

Foster-Bell was vice-chair of Monarchy New Zealand in 2012–13.

Member of Parliament

Foster-Bell contested  at the 2002 general election, losing to incumbent David Benson-Pope. Foster-Bell stood in the  electorate during the 2011 general election.
Foster-Bell was called to Parliament in May 2013 as a list MP, replacing Jackie Blue. He was sworn in on 28 May 2013. He was a member of the Health Committee and of the Justice and Electoral Committee.

In March 2014, Foster-Bell sought the National Party nomination in the  electorate, but was beaten by Shane Reti. Foster-Bell stood in Wellington Central once more, and was beaten by Labour's Grant Robertson. With a higher list placing of 46, and was returned as a member of parliament.

Foster-Bell was part of a cross-party group initiated by Jan Logie to look at and advocate for LGBTI rights. The group consisted of Catherine Delahunty (Green), Chris Bishop (National), David Seymour (Act), Denis O'Rouke (NZ First), Denise Roche (Green), James Shaw (Green), Jan Logie (Green), Kevin Hague (Green), Louisa Wall (Labour), Nanaia Mahuta (Labour), Paul Foster-Bell (National), and Trevor Mallard (Labour).

Foster-Bell courted controversy in 2016 when news broke that he had 12 staff leave his office in the 2013–2016 period, amidst claims by former staffers that he had bullied them. Foster-Bell strongly denied these allegations, saying that he was not a bully.

In 2016 Foster-Bell also received criticism for his travel expenses, which totaled more than $61,000 for a one-year period. Prime Minister John Key defended Foster-Bell's expenses, saying "It's not unusual for us to use a list MP, certainly someone with skills like he has in foreign affairs, around the country. Other MPs ask him to support them in terms of talks or seminars ... or to fill in, for instance, for ministers."

In February 2017, Foster-Bell announced that he had withdrawn from the National Party's candidate selections for the  election and would retire from politics.

Personal life
In 2016 Foster-Bell announced that he was gay in response to remarks made by Destiny Church leader Brian Tamaki regarding homosexuals.

Notes

References

External links

Profile on the New Zealand National Party website.
Profile on the New Zealand Parliament website.

1977 births
Living people
New Zealand National Party MPs
LGBT members of the Parliament of New Zealand
Gay politicians
LGBT conservatism
Māori MPs
Members of the New Zealand House of Representatives
New Zealand diplomats
New Zealand list MPs
New Zealand monarchists
New Zealand expatriates in Pakistan
People educated at Whangarei Boys' High School
University of Otago alumni
Unsuccessful candidates in the 2002 New Zealand general election
Unsuccessful candidates in the 2011 New Zealand general election
21st-century New Zealand politicians